Gordon Richard Newell (born February 18, 1948) is a Canadian retired professional ice hockey player who played seven games in the National Hockey League for the Detroit Red Wings and 25 games in the World Hockey Association for the Phoenix Roadrunners between 1972 and 1975. The rest of his career, which lasted from 1969 to 1978, was spent in various minor leagues.

Career statistics

Regular season and playoffs

External links
 

1948 births
Living people
Canadian expatriate ice hockey players in England
Canadian expatriate ice hockey players in the United States
Canadian ice hockey defencemen
Detroit Red Wings players
London Lions (ice hockey) players
Minnesota Duluth Bulldogs men's ice hockey players
Omaha Knights (CHL) players
Phoenix Roadrunners (PHL) players
Phoenix Roadrunners (WHA) players
Phoenix Roadrunners (WHL) players
Providence Reds players
Ice hockey people from Winnipeg
Syracuse Blazers players
Tucson Mavericks players
Tulsa Oilers (1964–1984) players
Undrafted National Hockey League players
Virginia Wings players